The Montenegrin LGBT Association Queer Montenegro is a non-governmental organization established in October 2012. and registered in March 2013 in Podgorica. Queer Montenegro consists of longtime activists for human rights, and professionals from various fields of social life and different specialties.

History of organization
Montenegrin LGBT Association Queer Montenegro emerged from informal LGBT group ‘Queer Brigade’ which was recognized for its striking performances in the field of human rights in Montenegro.  The idea for the establishment of the organization was created out of a desire to take on a new and different way of promotion and protection of human rights of LGBTQ people, with special emphasis on identifying and solving real, everyday needs and life problems of LGBT people and their friends and families.

Goals
The aim of the organization involves the construction of a wide Montenegro's LGBT movement which will be actively and continuously in the fight for the protection of human rights, combating homophobia and transphobia, achieving full legal and social equality and the full acceptance of LGBT people by general population. One of the goals is the visibility and participation of LGBT people in decision-making and policy-making process related to human rights; continuous festivals of queer arts and culture and other events, as well as the improvement of health services.

The methods of the organization
The organization achieves its overall program goals acting in public life, and it deals with: advocacy and lobbying human rights of LGBTIQ persons at national, European and international level; supporting and participating in the organization of public meetings of LGBTIQ person, Pride events and parades in our country, the region and abroad in order to increase the visibility of LGBT persons and advocacy for protection of human rights; sensitizing the public to promote the interests and improve the position of LGBTIQ people ; encouraging self-organization of young LGBT people for exercising their rights; providing free legal aid and psychosocial support and counseling for LGBT people ; organization of workshops, courses, lectures, seminars, forums, conferences and other activities ; organizing the festivals of queer arts and culture and other events.

Montenegro Pride

In October 20. 2013, NGO Queer Montenegro has organized first Montenegro pride in Podgorica. 

Since then Queer Montenegro has organized seven more pride parades in Podgorica.

Collaborations and partnerships 
Queer Montenegro collaborates with Association Spectra (original: Asocijacija Spektra) which was founded as daughter organization.

References

External links
 Official site Queer Montenegro
 Official site Montenegro Pride
 Facebook Queer Montenegro

2012 establishments in Montenegro
LGBT political advocacy groups in Montenegro
LGBT rights in Montenegro
Organisations based in Montenegro
Human rights in Montenegro